A statue of Canadian ice hockey player Wayne Gretzky by Erik Blome is installed outside Los Angeles' Crypto.com Arena, in the U.S. state of California. The bronze sculpture depicts Gretzky wearing his Los Angeles Kings uniform.

References 

Bronze sculptures in California
Monuments and memorials in Los Angeles
Outdoor sculptures in Greater Los Angeles
Sculptures of men in California
South Park (Downtown Los Angeles)
Statues in Los Angeles
Statues of sportspeople